Boundary tracing, also known as contour tracing, of a binary digital region can be thought of as a segmentation technique that identifies the boundary pixels of the digital region. Boundary tracing is an important first step in the analysis of that region.
Boundary is a topological notion. However, a digital image is no topological space. Therefore, it is impossible to define the notion of a boundary in a digital image mathematically exactly. Most publications about tracing the boundary of a subset S of a digital image I describe algorithms which find a set of pixels belonging to S and having in their direct neighborhood pixels belonging both to S and to its complement I - S. According to this definition the boundary of a subset S is different from the boundary of the complement I – S which is a topological paradox.
To define the boundary correctly it is necessary to introduce a topological space corresponding to the given digital image. Such space can be a two-dimensional abstract cell complex. It contains cells of three dimensions: the two-dimensional cells corresponding to pixels of the digital image, the one-dimensional cells or “cracks” representing short lines lying between two adjacent pixels, and the zero-dimensional cells or “points” corresponding to the corners of pixels. The boundary of a subset S is then a sequence of cracks and points while the neighborhoods of these cracks and points intersect both the subset S and its complement I – S. The boundary defined in this way corresponds exactly to the topological definition and corresponds also to our intuitive imagination of a boundary because the boundary of S should contain neither elements of S nor those of its complement. It should contain only elements lying between S and the complement. This are exactly the cracks and points of the complex.
This method of tracing boundaries is described in the book of Vladimir A. Kovalevsky and in the web site.

Algorithms
Algorithms used for boundary tracing:
 Square tracing algorithm
 Moore-neighbor tracing algorithm 
 Radial sweep 
 Theo Pavlidis’ algorithm 
 A generic approach using vector algebra for tracing of a boundary can be found at. 
 An extension of boundary tracing for segmentation of traced boundary into open and closed sub-section is described at.

Square tracing algorithm
The square tracing algorithm is simple, yet effective. Its behavior is completely based on whether one is on a black, or a white cell (assuming white cells are part of the shape). First, scan from the upper left to right and row by row. Upon entering your first white cell, the core of the algorithm starts. It consists mainly of two rules:
 If you are in a white cell, go left.
 If you are in a black cell, go right.
Keep in mind that it matters how you entered the current cell, so that left and right can be defined.

public void GetBoundary(byte[,] image)
{
    for (int j = 0; j < image.GetLength(1); j++)
        for (int i = 0; i < image.GetLength(0); i++)
            if (image[i, j] == 255)               // Found first white pixel
                SquareTrace(new Point(i, j));
}

public void SquareTrace(Point start)
{
    HashSet<Point> boundaryPoints = new HashSet<Point>();  // Use a HashSet to prevent double occurrences
    // We found at least one pixel
    boundaryPoints.Add(start);

    // The first pixel you encounter is a white one by definition, so we go left. 
    // Our initial direction was going from left to right, hence (1, 0)
    Point nextStep = GoLeft(new Point(1, 0));               
    Point next = start + nextStep;
    while (next != start)
    {
        // We found a black cell, so we go right and don't add this cell to our HashSet
        if (image[next.x, next.y] == 0)
        {
            next = next - nextStep;
            nextStep = GoRight(nextStep);
            next = next + nextStep;
        }
        // Alternatively we found a white cell, we do add this to our HashSet
        else
        {
            boundaryPoints.Add(next);
            nextStep = GoLeft(nextStep);
            next = next + nextStep;
        }
    }
}

private Point GoLeft(Point p) => new Point(p.y, -p.x);
private Point GoRight(Point p) => new Point(-p.y, p.x);

See also
 Pathfinding
 Curve sketching
 Chain code
 Pixel connectivity
 Optimization problem

References 

Digital topology